Ficopsis is an extinct genus of large sea snails, marine gastropod mollusks in the family Ficidae, the fig snails.

This species lived from the Paleocene to the Miocene in Africa, Asia, Europe, North America, and South America.

References

Further reading 
 Fossils (Smithsonian Handbooks) by David Ward (Page 126)

External links
Ficopsis in the Paleobiology Database

Ficidae
Paleocene gastropods
Eocene gastropods
Oligocene gastropods
Miocene gastropods
Cenozoic gastropods of Africa
Cenozoic gastropods of Asia
Cenozoic gastropods of Europe
Cenozoic gastropods of North America
Cenozoic gastropods of South America
Paleocene first appearances
Miocene genus extinctions